790 Pretoria is a minor planet orbiting the Sun that was discovered by English astronomer Harry Edwin Wood on January 16, 1912. It is a member of the  Cybele group located beyond the core of the main belt (see Minor planet groups) and named after Pretoria, the capital city of South Africa.

10μ radiometric data collected from Kitt Peak in 1975 gave a diameter estimate of 175 km. In the present day it is estimated to be  in diameter. Photometric measurements of the asteroid made in 2005 at the Palmer Divide Observatory showed a light curve with a period of 10.370 ± 0.002 hours and a brightness variation of 0.08 ± 0.03 in magnitude.

Between 1998 and 2021, 790 Pretoria has been observed to occult twelve stars.

References

External links 
 Lightcurve plot of 790 Pretoria, Palmer Divide Observatory, B. D. Warner (2009)
 Asteroid Lightcurve Database (LCDB), query form (info )
 Dictionary of Minor Planet Names, Google books
 Asteroids and comets rotation curves, CdR – Observatoire de Genève, Raoul Behrend
 Discovery Circumstances: Numbered Minor Planets (1)-(5000) – Minor Planet Center
 
 

Cybele asteroids
Pretoria
Pretoria
P-type asteroids (Tholen)
19120116